The Campeonato Centroamericano was the first attempt for an international tournament for the CONCACAF region.

History
The first tournament was held in 1959 with one team from North America and three from Central America. No tournament held in 1960 but a second edition was held in 1961. In 1961, the tournament was renamed to Campeónato Centroamericano y Caribe since the tournament was held between clubs from Central America and the Caribbean. This was the last edition as the following year in 1962 the CONCACAF Champions' Cup began. The Campeonato Centroamericano served as an unofficial forerunner to the international tournament between CONCACAF clubs eventually leading to the current CONCACAF Champions League.

Qualification

1959

North America
 Guadalajara

Central America
 FAS
 Alajuelense
 Olimpia

1961

Central America
 Águila
 Alajuelense
 Comunicaciones
 Olimpia

Caribbean
 Jong Holland

Finals

Best result by country

References

External links 
 CONCACAF Official Site

 
CONCACAF club competitions